Xu Yan (born 22 January 1985) is a Singaporean table tennis player.

She competed at the 2006 Commonwealth Games where she won a gold medal in the women's team event, a silver medal in the women's doubles event and a bronze in the women's singles event.

Xu had left Singapore.

References

1985 births
Living people
Chinese female table tennis players
Singaporean female table tennis players
Chinese emigrants to Singapore
Singaporean sportspeople of Chinese descent
Naturalised table tennis players
Table tennis players at the 2006 Commonwealth Games
Commonwealth Games medallists in table tennis
Commonwealth Games gold medallists for Singapore
Commonwealth Games silver medallists for Singapore
Commonwealth Games bronze medallists for Singapore
Southeast Asian Games medalists in table tennis
Medallists at the 2006 Commonwealth Games